Krithi Shetty, known by the stage name Advaitha, is an Indian actress appearing in predominantly Tamil language films.

Career
At one of her Bharatanatyam performances, theatre director Jai Theertha, noticed that the actress is very talented and he convinced her to join Samasthi Sunday School of Drama. Consequently, she pursued a diploma course in drama and performed in a play titled ‘Preethi’, later having an opportunity to play the lead role in 'Sadarame’, performing all over the state of Karnataka. Krithi collaborated with director Sunil Kumar Desai, and won the lead role in the Kannada film Sarigama. At the same time, she met Murali from the Tamil film industry who offered her an opportunity to play the lead role in Sagakkal directed by Swami. The actress then starred in Suseenthiran's critically acclaimed Azhagarsamiyin Kuthirai (2011) alongside Inigo Prabhakaran, before featuring in another little known Tamil film Kondaan Koduthaan, the following year.

In 2013, she changed her screen name from Advaitha to her original name in time for the release of Snehavin Kadhalargal. She noted that the name Advaitha had been chosen for numerological reasons, but stated she did not like the way people pronounced the name. She worked again with Suseenthiran, portraying a small role in Pandiya Naadu. Her future projects include Maanga with Premgi Amaren, Sevili and the heroine-centric Snehavin Kadhalargal.

Filmography

References

External links
 

Living people
Actresses in Tamil cinema
21st-century Indian actresses
Indian film actresses
Year of birth missing (living people)